The National Land Survey of Finland is an official body, dealing with cartography and cadastre issues in Finland. It is subordinated the Finnish Ministry of Agriculture and Forestry.

On May 1, 2012 the National Land Survey opened its topographic datasets for free use.

Organization
The current director is Arvo Kokkonen. The National Land Survey of Finland has offices in 37 localities across Finland, from Mariehamn to Ivalo. The number of employees totals approximately 2000. The organisation consists of a central administration and four operations units, which are Production, General Administration, Centre for ICT Services, and the Finnish Geospatial Research Institute (FGI). 

The National Land Survey deals both with cartographic and cadastre questions, and upholds a national Geographic Information System. Furthermore, the NLS provides services concerning land, environment and buildings. The main customer is the private sector.

Directors General 
 Abraham Nordenstedt 1812–1820 
 Abraham Joachim Molander 1821–1828 
 Carl Gustaf Tawaststjerna 1828–1843 
 Jonas Ferdinand Bergenheim 1843–1845
 Alexander Rechenberg 1847–1854
 Clas Wilhelm Gyldèn 1854–1872
 Berndt Otto Nymalm 1872–1887 
 Jaakko Sjölin 1887–1915 
 Otto Sarvi 1915–1917
 Kyösti Haataja 1917–1929 
 Väinö Ahla 1929–1950 
 Väinö V. Seppälä 1950–1960
 Viljo Niskanen 1960–1972 
 Lauri Kantee 1972–1991 
 Jarmo Ratia 1991–1999 
 Pauli Karvinen 1999–2000
 Jarmo Ratia 2000–2012
 Arvo Kokkonen 2012–
Source:

References

External links 

National mapping agencies
Government-owned companies of Finland
Geography of Finland
Land registration